The 2015–16 season was Zob Ahan Football Club's 15th season in the Iran Pro League, and their 20th consecutive season in the top division of Iranian football. They also competed in the Hazfi Cup and AFC Champions League, and had their 45nd year in existence as a football club.

Players

First-team squad
As of 30  May 2016.

Iran Pro League squad
As of 19 January 2016

Transfers
Confirmed transfers 2015–16

Summer

In:

Out:

Winter

In:

Out:

Competitions

Overview

Iran Pro League

Standings

Results summary

Results by round

Matches

AFC Champions League

Group B

Round of 16

Al-Ain won 3–1 on aggregate.

Hazfi Cup

Matches

Round of 32

Last 16

Quarter-final

Semi-final (1/2 Final – Last 4)

Final

Friendly matches

Statistics

Appearances 

|}

Top scorers
Includes all competitive matches. The list is sorted by shirt number when total goals are equal.

Last updated on 30 May 2016

Friendlies and pre-season goals are not recognized as competitive match goals.

Most assists
Includes all competitive matches. The list is sorted by shirt number when total assists are equal.

Last updated on 5 January 2016

Friendlies and pre-season goals are not recognized as competitive match assists.

Disciplinary record
Includes all competitive matches. Players with 1 card or more included only.

Last updated on 30 May 2016

Goals conceded 
 Updated on 30 May 2016

Own goals 
 Updated on 5 January 2016

Club

Coaching staff

Other information

See also

 2015–16 Persian Gulf Pro League
 2015–16 Hazfi Cup
 2016 AFC Champions League

References

External links
Iran Premier League Statistics
Persian League

2015-16
Iranian football clubs 2015–16 season